Aurelio Ramón González Benítez (25 September 1905 in Luque, Paraguay – 9 July 1997) was a Paraguayan football player.

González is one of the greatest football players of Paraguay, considered by many as the second best player behind Arsenio Erico. He started his career in Sportivo Luqueño and then moved to Olimpia of Asunción where he spent the rest of his career winning several championships, most notably the three consecutive national championships obtained by Olimpia in 1927, 1928 and 1929.

In the early 1930s he rejected an offer worth millions from San Lorenzo de Almagro of Argentina in order to fight for his country, Paraguay, in the Chaco War. He also was a vital player of the Paraguay national team scoring several goals in the 1920s and 1930s, and participated at the 1930 World Cup.

As a coach, he led Olimpia of Asunción to numerous championships and to the first Copa Libertadores final in 1960. He also coached the Paraguay national team in the 1958 World Cup.

References

1905 births
1997 deaths
1930 FIFA World Cup players
1958 FIFA World Cup managers
Association football forwards
Club Olimpia footballers
Club Olimpia managers
Paraguay international footballers
Paraguay national football team managers
Paraguayan football managers
Paraguayan footballers
Paraguayan soldiers
Sportspeople from Luque
People of the Chaco War
Sportivo Luqueño players
Sportivo Luqueño managers